, or Three Eight, is a Japanese comedy manga series written and illustrated by Noriko Kuwata.

Story 
The newly opened Suehiro Detective Agency is composed of laid-back manager Hisago, dog-loving chief investigator Shimeki and administrator Tsukumo. With very few paying customers, the three protagonists are free to spend their time bickering with and teasing one another, setting each other up in matchmaking schemes and looking for lost pets. Shimeki also has to contend with his knife-wielding ex-wife and the overly dependent little brother he has just been re-united with.

Manga

Volume list

Critical response
IGN gave the first volume of 888 a rating of "Pass It", complaining that "nothing happens, and it keeps on not happening for eight chapters".

References

External links

Comedy anime and manga
ComicsOne titles
Gentosha manga
Mystery anime and manga
Seinen manga